Paracincia butleri is a moth of the subfamily Arctiinae. It was described by William D. Field in 1950. It is found on Jamaica.

References

Lithosiini
Moths of North America
Insects of Jamaica
Moths described in 1950